NGR may refer to:

Natal Government Railways
Nepal Government Railway
New Generation Rollingstock operated by Queensland Rail, Australia
Nigeria (International Olympic Committee country-code)
Nonhomogeneous Gaussian regression (a statistical method for calibrating weather forecasts)
North Gloucestershire Railway in England